Bumpin Uglies is an American punk reggae band from Annapolis, Maryland. 

The band's music features a "melody-driven, free-spirited blend of ska, reggae, and punk with a strong focus on lyrics and crowd-pleasing grooves."

The band's influences are a mix of ska-punk and reggae drawn from pioneering bands Sublime, Bad Religion, Reel Big Fish, and Goldfinger.

History

Formation and Free Candy (2008–2011)
The group was founded in 2008 by guitarist and vocalist Brandon Hardesty, and percussionist Zach Pfefferkorn. The band name came from Zach, who threw out the idea of Bumpin' Uglies as they were trying to think of the funniest and most memorable band name possible.

Later, Ben McNulty joined as a bass player and Keenan Leader joined as the drummer. Since then the band has refined its sound with complimentary musicians, ending with the current band consisting of Brandon Hardesty, Dave Wolf, T.J. Haslett, and Ethan Lichtenberger.

The band's first full-length album Free Candy was released on June 11, 2011, and was a strong debut. The release party was thrown at "The Whiskey", a former music venue in Annapolis, Maryland. It featured the singles "Addictive Personality" and "Hallucinations".

Go Folk Yourself and Ninjah: Reggae Assassins (2012–2014)
A year later on June 17, 2012, Go Folk Yourself, their second album, was released. 

Then another rapid release, their third LP, titled Ninjah: Reggae Assassins, premiered on May 28, 2013 with their first single, "Morning After". 

The next year, they followed up with a live album titled Load In/Load Out: Live at 8x10, released on April 8, 2014.

Since these albums, Bumpin Uglies went from regional favorites on the East Coast, first starting out in clubs and smaller venues, to a more national draw, with heavily touring all over the United States, then onto bigger festivals.

Touring and EPs (2015–2016)
While continuously touring, their first EP, Freakout Hell Bus, was released on June 2, 2015. A followup EP, Sublime With No One, was released on October 16, 2015 and garnered as much attention from its title as the new songs it contained. Their third EP, Better. Faster. Stronger, was released on June 4, 2016.

Keep It Together and Beast From The East (2016)
The band's fourth album, Keep It Together, was released on September 9, 2016 on Right Coast Records.

In December 2016, the trio became a quartet when they added a fourth member, Chad Wright, on keyboard and some vocals. His first album with the band was their fifth LP, Beast from the East, their most acclaimed album, which released on April 6, 2018. The band had four Billboard Top Reggae Album of the Week placements, including a #1 spot with Beast From The East on April 21, 2018.

They are currently signed to Ineffable Records.

The band recorded their first acoustic album,Songs From the Basement on September 26, 2017, which featured acoustic versions of their popular singles from their past albums.

Buzz EP and live acoustic album (2019)
On March 22, 2019, the band released their fourth EP, titled Buzz, a six-song complication, including their single "Buzz", featuring friends, Tropidelic. They released Live @ Sugarshack Sessions, their second acoustic album, on October 4, 2019.

Keep Your Suitcase Packed (2020)
Their sixth album, Keep Your Suitcase Packed, was released on Ineffable Records on June 12, 2020. The album featured singles "Florida Showers" (feat. Leilani Wolfgramm), "I Just Am", and "Suburbia". Shortly after the release, Chad Wright left the band to concentrate on other projects. He was replaced on keyboard by Ethan Lichtenberger, who also plays the trumpet and trombone.

'The Never Ending Drop' project (2020–2021)
In 2020 and 2021, the band worked on their own project called "The Never Ending Drop". In a year when they had to stop touring due to the COVID-19 pandemic, Hardesty explained, "we decided to double down on the music making portion of our job description", and then released a single every month; whether if it was a viral video, acoustic set or a studio track released to stream.

Bumpin Uglies was featured as one of many reggae bands on Collie Buddz riddim album, Cali Roots Riddim 2020 with their single, "Mid-Atlantic Dub", which was produced by Buddz and mixed by Stick Figure's touring guitarist, producer Johnny Cosmic.

On January 15, 2021, Bumpin Uglies was one of several reggae and punk bands on The House That Bradley Built, a charity compilation honoring Sublime's lead singer Bradley Nowell, helping musicians with substance abuse. They covered Sublime's song "Same In The End".

Mid-Atlantic Dub (2022)

Bumpin Uglies Facebook recorded their seventh studio album titled, Mid-Atlantic Dub, released on September 16, 2022. The 13-track album features special guests; Ballyhoo!, The Elovaters, Little Stranger, Jacob Hemphill of SOJA, Trevor Young, Wax and Tropidelic.

Mid-Atlantic Dub is also being "considered" for a Grammy Award nomination "Best Reggae Album" at the 65th Grammy Awards in 2023.

Other projects
Bumpin Uglies created a custom beer with Maryland's RAR Brewing to celebrate the release of the band's latest album, Mid-Atlantic Dub. The limited edition 16 ounce can was only available exclusively at OktoberWest (West Virginia's "largest beer festival") in Charleston, West Virginia on September 24, 2022.

Lineup

Current members

Brandon Hardesty – lead vocals, guitar, songwriter (2008–present)
Dave "Wolfie" Wolf – bass, vocals (2010–present)
T.J. Haslett  – drums (2015–present)
Ethan Lee Lichtenberger  – keyboard, trombone (2021–present)
Will Lopez - tenor saxophone, guitar (2022-present)

Former members
Zach Pfefferkorn – percussion (2008–2009)
Ben McNulty – bass (2008–2010)
Keenan Leader – drums (2008–2013)
Mike Breach (2009-2010)
Chad Wright – keyboard, vocals (2017–2020)

Discography

Studio albums

Live albums/EPs

Singles

References

American reggae musical groups
Musical groups from Maryland